Barnabas Imenger Jr. (born 24 November 1990) is a Nigerian football forward who most recently played for MC Alger in the Algerian Ligue Professionnelle 1. He is the son of former Nigeria International Barnabas Imenger.

Club career
After beginning his career at Kwara United F.C. he signed with Swedish side Trelleborgs FF in August 2012 for a six-month contract.

After his six months were up, he returned to Nigeria to play for Lobi Stars, the team where his father is a board member.

He was loaned to Kano Pillars F.C. at the beginning of the 2015 season but was recalled in July.

International career
He was called up by coach Stephen Keshi for a new batch of Super Eagles in January 2012 and debuted in a 0-0 friendly against Angola. He also played in a 3-2 friendly loss to Egypt.

References

External links
Barnabas Imenger Jr. at Footballdatabase

Living people
Nigerian footballers
Nigeria international footballers
Kwara United F.C. players
Trelleborgs FF players
Lobi Stars F.C. players
Kano Pillars F.C. players
MC Alger players
1991 births
Expatriate footballers in Algeria
Nigerian expatriate sportspeople in Algeria
Association football forwards
Nigeria A' international footballers
2014 African Nations Championship players
Nigerian expatriate sportspeople in Sweden
Expatriate footballers in Sweden